Rugby union in Sweden is a minor but growing sport. The Swedish Rugby Union ( was founded in 1932, and joined the IRB in 1988.

History
"Swedish football" in the nineteenth century was a variant of association football with some rugby elements. By 1900, Swedish football clubs were using the Football Association's rules, with no rugby influence.

The pure form of rugby was introduced between the wars. The visiting cruisers of the British Royal Navy,  and  played the first recorded match in Stockholm The sport became well established in this period thanks also to the efforts of Yves Gylden, who had learnt the game in France, and founded the first three Swedish clubs in Stockholm.

As with many other countries in Europe, the Second World War nearly finished off the game. Sweden was neutral in this conflict, meaning that the game did not suffer the war casualties that it did in other countries. By 1960, the number of active clubs had declined to fewer than ten. This was remedied in the 60s and 70s by an intensive development programme, which helped to bring that figure up to at least 55 clubs in the mid 90s.

A persistent problem for Swedish rugby has been the climate, which means that many pitches may be under snow for large parts of the year. For this reason rugby is a summer sport in Sweden, the season running from late April to the middle of October.

Notable players include:
 Kari Tapper, a Number 8, who played for the Barbarians
 Kanogo Njuru, an Outside centre, who played for the Barbarians.

Club Rugby
The Allsvenskan is the highest tier of the national rugby union competition in Sweden. The first Swedish championship took place in 1943 and the current champions (2016) is Stockholm Exiles. Under the Allsvenskan is two levels of regional competition.

New for the 2010 season is a national rugby sevens series that will be played over multiple weekends. This initiative comes from the decision by the IOC to include rugby sevens in the Olympics.

The Swedish club champions also compete for the Nordic Cup with fellow club champions of Denmark, Finland and Norway.

See also
Sweden national rugby union team
 Allsvenskan - Sweden's highest rugby union league

References
Richards, Huw A Game for Hooligans: The History of Rugby Union (Mainstream Publishing, Edinburgh, 2007)

External links
Swedish Rugby Federation (Swedish)
 Archives du Rugby: Suede